This article displays the rosters for the participating teams at the 1988 Tournament of the Americas played in Montevideo, Uruguay from May 22 to May 31, 1988.

Argentina

4 Raúl Merlo
5 Marcelo Richotti
6 Luis Villar
7 Carlos Raffaelli
8 Sebastián Uranga
9 Germán Filloy
10 Sergio Aispurúa
11 Miguel Cortijo
12 Jorge Faggiano
13 Rubén Scolari
14 Esteban Pérez
15 Jorge González
Head coach:  Alberto Finguer

Brazil

4 Paulinho
5 Maury
6 Gerson
7 Pipoka
8 Rolando
9 Cadum
10 Guerrinha
11 Marcel
12 Luiz Felipe
13 Paulão
14 Oscar
15 Israel
Head coach:  Ary Ventura Vidal

Canada

4 Alan Kristmanson
5 David Turcotte
6 Eli Pasquale
7 Karl Tilleman
8 Norman Clarke
9 Jay Triano
10 Dwight Walton
11 John Hatch
12 Barry Mungar
13 Romel Raffin
14 Wayne Yearwood
15 Barry Bekkedam
Head coach: / Jack Donohue

Mexico

4 Jorge León
5 Antonio Reyes
6 Juan Gallardo
7 Roberto González
8 Enrique González
9 Apolonio Torres
10 Francisco Siller
11 Luis López
12 Arturo Sánchez
13 José Luis Arroyos
14 Benjamín Gómez
15 Norberto Mena
Head coach:  Jorge Toussaint

Puerto Rico

4 José Ortiz
5 Federico López
6 Raymond Gause
7 Jerry Ocasio
8 Jerome Mincy
9 Edwin Pellot
10 Angelo Cruz
11 Ramón Ramos
12 Mario Morales
13 Edgar de León
14 Francisco de León
15 Ramón Rivas
Head coach:  Armando Torres

Uruguay

4 Adolfo Medrick
5 Luis Larrosa
6 Luis Pierri
7 Hébert Núñez
8 Gustavo Szczygielski
9 Horacio Perdomo
10 Carlos Peinado
11 Walter Pagani
12 Óscar Moglia
13 Álvaro Tito
14 Juan Mignone
15 Fernando López
Head coach:  Javier Espíndola

Venezuela

4 Carlos Aguilera
5 Felice Parisi
6 Armando Becker
7 Nelson Solórzano
8 Rostyn González
9 Jamal Elhawi
10 José Echenique
11 Carl Herrera
12 Luis Sosa
13 Gabriel Estaba
14 Iván Olivares
15 Armando Palacios
Head coach:  Pedro Espinoza

Bibliography

External links
1988 American Olympic Qualifying Tournament for Men at fiba.com

FIBA AmeriCup squads